The Producers Guild of America Award for Best Streamed or Televised Movie, also known as the Award for Outstanding Producer of Streamed or Televised Movies, is an annual award given by the Producers Guild of America. It was first awarded at the 30th Annual Producers Guild Awards after the guild announced to split the award for Outstanding Producer of Long-Form Television into two: this accolade and the David L. Wolper Award for Outstanding Producer of Limited Series Television.

Winners and nominees

2010s

2020s

Total awards by network
 Disney+ – 1
 HBO – 1
 Nat Geo – 1
 The Roku Channel – 1
 YouTube – 1

Total nominations by network
 HBO – 6
 Netflix – 6
 Disney+ – 3
 Hulu – 2
 Nat Geo – 2
 Prime Video – 2
 Apple TV+ – 1
 HBO Max – 1
 Lifetime – 1
 The Roku Channel – 1
 YouTube – 1

References

Streamed or TV Movie
Awards established in 2018